The 2nd Golden Satellite Awards, given on February 22, 1998, honored the best in film and television of 1997.

Special achievement awards
Mary Pickford Award (for outstanding contribution to the entertainment industry) – Jodie Foster

Outstanding New Talent – Aaron Eckhart

Motion picture winners and nominees

Best Actor – Drama
 Robert Duvall – The Apostle
Russell Crowe – L.A. Confidential
Matt Damon – Good Will Hunting
Leonardo DiCaprio – Titanic
Djimon Hounsou – Amistad
Mark Wahlberg – Boogie Nights

Best Actor – Musical or Comedy
 Jack Nicholson – As Good as It Gets
Robert Carlyle – The Full Monty
Dustin Hoffman – Wag the Dog
Tommy Lee Jones – Men in Black
Kevin Kline – In & Out
Howard Stern – Private Parts

Best Actress – Drama
 Judi Dench – Mrs Brown
Joan Allen – The Ice Storm
Helena Bonham Carter – The Wings of the Dove
Julie Christie – Afterglow
Kate Winslet – Titanic

Best Actress – Musical or Comedy
 Helen Hunt – As Good as It Gets
Pam Grier – Jackie Brown
Lisa Kudrow – Romy and Michele's High School Reunion
Parker Posey – The House of Yes
Julia Roberts – My Best Friend's Wedding

Best Animated or Mixed Media Film
 Men in Black
Alien: Resurrection
Anastasia
The Lost World: Jurassic Park
Starship Troopers

Best Art Direction
 Titanic – Peter Lamont
Amistad
Gattaca
L.A. Confidential
The Wings of the Dove

Best Cinematography
 Amistad – Janusz Kaminski
Contact
Eve's Bayou
L.A. Confidential
Titanic

Best Costume Design
 Titanic – Deborah Lynn Scott
Amistad
Beaumarchais the Scoundrel (Beaumarchais, l'insolent)
Mrs Brown
The Wings of the Dove

Best Director
 James Cameron – Titanic
Paul Thomas Anderson – Boogie Nights
Curtis Hanson – L.A. Confidential
Steven Spielberg – Amistad
Gus Van Sant – Good Will Hunting

Best Documentary Film
 4 Little Girls
Fast, Cheap and Out of Control
Hype!
Shooting Porn
SICK: The Life & Death of Bob Flanagan, Supermasochist

Best Editing
 Titanic – Richard A. Harris and Conrad Buff
Air Force One
Amistad
Boogie Nights
L.A. Confidential

Best Film – Drama
 Titanic
Amistad
Boogie Nights
Good Will Hunting
L.A. Confidential

Best Film – Musical or Comedy
 As Good as It Gets
Deconstructing Harry
The Full Monty
In & Out
My Best Friend's Wedding

Best Foreign Language Film
 Shall We Dance? (Shall We Dansu?) • Japan
My Life in Pink (Ma vie en rose) • France
Ponette • France
The Promise (La promesse) • Belgium
Live Flesh (Carne trémula) • Spain

Best Original Score
 "Titanic" – James Horner
"Amistad" – John Williams
"Anastasia" – David Newman
"L.A. Confidential" – Jerry Goldsmith
"One Night Stand" – Mike Figgis

Best Original Song
 "My Heart Will Go On" performed by Céline Dion – Titanic
"Journey to the Past" – Anastasia
"Once Upon a December" – Anastasia
"A Song for Mama" – Soul Food
"Tomorrow Never Dies" – Tomorrow Never Dies

Best Screenplay – Adapted
 L.A. Confidential – Curtis Hanson and Brian Helgeland
Amistad – David Franzoni
The Ice Storm – James Schamus
The Sweet Hereafter – Atom Egoyan
The Wings of the Dove – Hossein Amini

Best Screenplay – Original
 Good Will Hunting – Ben Affleck and Matt Damon
Boogie Nights – Paul Thomas Anderson
The Full Monty – Simon Beaufoy
Mrs Brown – Jeremy Brock
Titanic – James Cameron

Best Supporting Actor – Drama
 Burt Reynolds – Boogie Nights
Billy Connolly – Mrs Brown
Danny DeVito – The Rainmaker
Samuel L. Jackson – Eve's Bayou
Robin Williams – Good Will Hunting

Best Supporting Actor – Musical or Comedy
 Rupert Everett – My Best Friend's Wedding
Mark Addy – The Full Monty
Cuba Gooding Jr. – As Good as It Gets
Greg Kinnear – As Good as It Gets
Rip Torn – Men in Black

Best Supporting Actress – Drama
 Julianne Moore – Boogie Nights
Minnie Driver – Good Will Hunting
Ashley Judd – Kiss the Girls
Debbi Morgan – Eve's Bayou
Sigourney Weaver – The Ice Storm

Best Supporting Actress – Musical or Comedy
 Joan Cusack – In & Out
Cameron Diaz – My Best Friend's Wedding
Linda Fiorentino – Men in Black
Anne Heche – Wag the Dog
Shirley Knight – As Good as It Gets

Best Visual Effects
 Contact – Ken Ralston
The Fifth Element
Men in Black
Starship Troopers
Titanic

Outstanding Motion Picture Ensemble
Boogie Nights

Television winners and nominees

Best Actor – Drama Series
 Jimmy Smits – NYPD Blue
David Duchovny – The X-Files
Dennis Franz – NYPD Blue
Sam Waterston – Law & Order
Michael T. Weiss – The Pretender

Best Actor – Musical or Comedy Series
 Kelsey Grammer – Frasier
Tim Allen – Home Improvement
Drew Carey – The Drew Carey Show
Michael J. Fox – Spin City
Garry Shandling – The Larry Sanders Show

Best Actor – Miniseries or TV Film
 Gary Sinise – George Wallace
Armand Assante – The Odyssey
Gabriel Byrne – Weapons of Mass Distraction
Sidney Poitier – Mandela and de Klerk
Ving Rhames – Don King: Only in America

Best Actress – Drama Series
 Kate Mulgrew – Star Trek: Voyager
Gillian Anderson – The X-Files
Kim Delaney – NYPD Blue
Julianna Margulies – ER
Ally Walker – Profiler

Best Actress – Musical or Comedy Series
 Tracey Ullman – Tracey Takes On...
Jane Curtin – 3rd Rock from the Sun
Ellen DeGeneres – Ellen
Helen Hunt – Mad About You
Brooke Shields – Suddenly Susan

Best Actress – Miniseries or TV Film
 Jennifer Beals – The Twilight of the Golds (TIE) 
 Alfre Woodard – Miss Evers' Boys (TIE)
Glenn Close – In the Gloaming
Greta Scacchi – The Odyssey
Meryl Streep – ...First Do No Harm

Best Miniseries or TV Film
 Don King: Only in America
Breast Men
George Wallace
Miss Evers' Boys
The Odyssey
Weapons of Mass Distraction

Best Series – Drama
 NYPD Blue
Homicide: Life on the Street
Law & Order
The Pretender
The X-Files

Best Series – Musical or Comedy
 Frasier
The Drew Carey Show
The Larry Sanders Show
Mad About You
Spin City

Best Supporting Actor – (Mini)Series or TV Film
 Vondie Curtis-Hall – Don King: Only in America
Jason Alexander – Cinderella
Joe Don Baker – George Wallace
Michael Caine – Mandela and de Klerk
Ossie Davis – Miss Evers' Boys

Best Supporting Actress – (Mini)Series or TV Film
 Ellen Barkin – Before Women Had Wings
Louise Fletcher – Breast Men
Bernadette Peters – Cinderella
Mimi Rogers – Weapons of Mass Distraction
Mare Winningham – George Wallace

New Media winners and nominees

CD-ROM Entertainment
Blade Runner
Hercules

Awards breakdown

Film
Winners:
7 / 12 Titanic: Best Art Direction / Best Costume Design / Best Director & Editing / Best Film – Drama / Best Original Score & Original Song
3 / 6 As Good as It Gets: Best Actor & Actress & Film – Musical or Comedy
2 / 7 Boogie Nights: Best Supporting Actor & Actress – Drama
1 / 1 4 Little Girls: Best Documentary Film
1 / 1 The Apostle: Best Actor – Drama
1 / 1 Shall We Dance? (Shall We Dansu?): Best Foreign Language Film
1 / 2 Contact: Best Visual Effects
1 / 3 In & Out: Best Supporting Actress – Musical or Comedy
1 / 4 Mrs Brown: Best Actress – Drama
1 / 4 My Best Friend's Wedding: Best Supporting Actor – Musical or Comedy
1 / 5 Men in Black: Best Animated or Mixed Media Film
1 / 6 Good Will Hunting: Best Screenplay – Original
1 / 8 L.A. Confidential: Best Screenplay – Adapted
1 / 9 Amistad: Best Cinematography

Losers:
0 / 4 Anastasia, The Full Monty, The Wings of the Dove
0 / 3 Eve's Bayou, The Ice Storm
0 / 2 Starship Troopers, Wag the Dog

Television
Winners:
2 / 2 Frasier: Best Actor – Musical or Comedy Series / Best Series – Musical or Comedy
2 / 3 Don King: Only in America: Best Actor – Miniseries or TV Film / Best Supporting Actor – (Mini)Series or TV Film
2 / 4 NYPD Blue: Best Actor – Drama Series / Best Series – Drama
1 / 1 Before Women Had Wings: Best Supporting Actress – (Mini)Series or TV Film
1 / 1 Star Trek: Voyager: Best Actress – Drama Series
1 / 1 Tracey Takes On...: Best Actress – Musical or Comedy Series
1 / 1 The Twilight of the Golds: Best Actress – Miniseries or TV Film
1 / 3 Miss Evers' Boys: Best Actress – Miniseries or TV Film
1 / 4 George Wallace: Best Actor – Miniseries or TV Film

Losers:
0 / 3 The Odyssey, Weapons of Mass Distraction, The X-Files
0 / 2 Cinderella, The Drew Carey Show, The Larry Sanders Show, Law & Order, Mad About You, Mandela and de Klerk, The Pretender, Spin City

References
 Satellite Awards – IMDb

External links
1998 2nd Annual SATELLITE™ Awards Nominees and Winners

Satellite Awards ceremonies
1997 awards
1997 film awards
1997 television awards